Haapala is a Finnish surname. Notable people with the surname include:

Arto Haapala (born 1959), Finnish philosopher
Eero Haapala (born 1989), Finnish long jumper
Henrik Haapala (born 1994), Finnish professional ice hockey forward
Hilja Haapala (1877–1958), Finnish writer
Mark Haapala, American producer, screenwriter, and director
Tuomas Haapala (born 1979), Finnish footballer

Finnish-language surnames

fi:Haapala
fr:Haapala